Joseph or Joe Keegan may refer to:

Joseph Keegan (comedian), known as Joseph Elvin, (1862–1935), Cockney comedian and music hall entertainer
Joseph M. Keegan (1922–2007), politician